Kommunalbanken Norway (KBN) is a AAA/ Aaa rated local government funding agency 100 per cent owned by the Royal Ministry of Local Government and Regional Development on behalf of the Kingdom of Norway. Established by an act of Parliament in 1926 as a state administrative body, and started operations in 1927. KBN gained its current status and structure through a conversion act in 1999. KBN is a direct continuation of its predecessor Norges Kommunalbank and has for 85 years been the main provider of credit to the local government sector in Norway. Today, KBN is defined as a state instrumentality serving a public policy function of providing low cost funding to Norwegian municipalities. The agency’s mandate also includes promoting competition in the market, thereby facilitating the efficient provision of public services in Norway. KBNs operations are strictly regulated and the agency may only lend to Norwegian local governments, counties and inter-municipal companies, and against a local government guarantee. KBN is the largest provider of credit to local authorities in Norway, commanding a market share of approximately 50 per cent. More than 97 per cent of municipalities and counties have loans with KBN.

References

External links
 Corporate web site

Banks of Norway
Defunct government agencies of Norway
Companies based in Oslo
Banks established in 1927